ID is an independently owned and operated public relations firm. ID works with actors, directors, writers, musicians, brands, corporations and production companies.

ID was established in 1993 by Kelly Bush Novak. It is headquartered in Los Angeles, California, with an office in New York City.

History
Kelly Bush founded ID in 1993, after having acquired two years of business experience. Her first major client was Patrick Stewart, who is still represented by Bush today. Bush's longtime clients include Tobey Maguire, Diane Lane, Ben Stiller, Catherine Keener, Alicia Keys and Paul Reubens; she also consults with Warner Bros. Pictures Group as well as Sony Pictures Classics. In 2008, Bush formed VIE Entertainment where she became manager to Paul Reubens and Academy-award nominated actor Elliot Page.

A 2011 New York Times profile described the firm as one of “a handful of elite firms that protect and promote the biggest names in show business..” and mentioned clients including Paul Reubens (Pee Wee Herman), Ben Stiller, Tobey Maguire, Amy Adams, Josh Brolin, Natalie Portman, Sean Penn and others.

Drake and the company had a high-profile parting in 2014.

ID was ranked 5th on Forbes List of America's Best PR Agencies 2021.

Divisions
ID’s divisions include film, brands, talent, digital, and music. Clients for each division include:

 Film

The King's Speech

Twilight

Which Way Home

 Brands

Variety Power of Women

ELLE women in Hollywood

Tiffany & Co.

 Digital

Paul Reubens

Ben Stiller

Stand Up to Cancer

 Music

A. R. Rahman

Natasha Bedingfield

LL Cool J

Notes and references

Public relations companies